Return to Sender is a 2015 American psychological thriller film directed by Fouad Mikati and starring Rosamund Pike, Shiloh Fernandez, and Nick Nolte.

Plot
Miranda Wells is a nurse living in a small town. She is about to become a surgical nurse and is buying a new house. Her friend sets her up on a blind date with a man named Kevin. On the day of the date, while she's still getting ready, Miranda finds someone outside her porch, whom she assumes is Kevin, and invites him in. She offers him lemonade and goes into her bedroom to finish dressing. When she comes out of her room she sees he is blocking the door. Beginning to feel uneasy, she asks him to leave and come back later for their date. He refuses, and walks to the door and locks it. He then attacks and rapes her. Later he is seen running away from the house as someone else comes to the door and knocks. The door is slightly open and the man, Kevin, comes in calling out for Miranda. He finds her in the kitchen and calls the police. Miranda is next seen in the hospital, beaten, and having a rape kit and photos taken by the police. The police ask if she had ever seen the man before, and she says that, actually, she had. They promptly go and arrest the rapist, William Finn.

Miranda tries to carry on with her life normally. Her real estate agent tells her that they can't sell her house now as no one wants to buy a house where someone was just raped. While icing a cake at home she notices a tremor in her right hand and realizes that she can't work in surgery because of it. She decides to write a letter to William in prison.

Miranda's letter to William keeps being returned to sender. She continues to resend the letter and finally receives a response and goes to visit William. He apologizes repeatedly for what he did to her and she begins to visit him regularly. They become friendly and flirt with each other during her visits. While in prison, William has also been abusing his cell mate without the knowledge of the officers and is eventually released on parole.

Meanwhile, Miranda also befriends her father's aggressive dog by feeding him treats. The dog gets sick, stops eating, and eventually dies.

When he is released, William sends Miranda flowers and makes plans to visit her. When he arrives at her home she puts him to work fixing up the porch of her house. They continue to flirt but she never allows him into her house. When William goes to the hardware store where Mitchell works, Mitchell realizes who he is and charges over to Miranda's house to warn her he is out of prison. When he realises William has been to the house, they have an argument.

One day after working on the porch, William says he is not feeling well and begs to be allowed in to use the bathroom. Miranda reluctantly agrees and upon entering the house he collapses. When he wakes up he finds himself strapped to a bed in the basement. She admits to poisoning him with antifreeze in his lemonade. Miranda tells him that she also poisoned her father's dog and allowed her mother to die. He then passes out again as she rolls over a surgical tray. Over the next few hours she operates and when he wakes up, leads him to believe she has amputated his left hand, taunting him with a fake one and asking what matters to him. It is later revealed that she actually castrated him. The film ends with Miranda visiting her father, stating that William will not be coming around any more.

Cast

Release 
Return to Sender was released in the United Kingdom on May 22, 2015. Image Entertainment acquired the U.S. distribution rights to the film, and released the film on August 14, 2015, in a limited release.

Reception
On Rotten Tomatoes, the film has a 14% approval rating based on reviews from 35 critics. On Metacritic it has a weighted average score of 23% based on reviews from 9 critics, indicating "generally unfavorable reviews".

Mark Kermode of The Observer rated it 3 out of 5 stars and wrote, "Gone Girls Rosamund Pike brings icy zeal to her role as a rape survivor who starts visiting her assailant in jail". Benjamin Lee of The Guardian rated it 2 out of 5 stars and wrote, "There are few surprises in this cheapo thriller about a nurse who strikes up a relationship with the man who attacked her in her home." Geoffrey Macnab of The Independent rated it 2 out of 5 stars and wrote, "The film has the feel of a glorified TV movie and lurches into Misery-style melodrama in its final reel." Mike McCahill of The Daily Telegraph rated it 2 out of 5 stars and called it "cinematic clickbait that hides its weakest material behind spoilers, and hopes its audience will be gullible enough to proceed".

References

External links 
 

2015 films
2015 psychological thriller films
American psychological thriller films
American rape and revenge films
Films scored by Daniel Hart
Films about nurses
2010s English-language films
2010s American films